Márcio José Lisboa Fortes Filho commonly known as Marcinho Pitbull (born 8 June 1987) is a Brazilian footballer.

Club career

Brazil
The defensive midfielder began playing football at the age of nine and only at the age of ten he arrived at Flamengo Club as he caught the attraction of professionals with his speed and marking ability. At Flamengo, he was with the players of generation that were crowned champions of the Campeonato Carioca de Juniores in 2005, 2006 and 2007.

He had his first opportunity as a professional for Flamengo at the end of the 2006 Campeonato Brasileiro Série A. He played the last four games for his club under the leadership of then-manager, Ney Franco.

In 2007, he played several games either under Franco or Joel Santana and continued to train with the club in Estádio da Gávea. At the end of the year, he moved on loan to Macaé FC to play in the 2008 Campeonato Carioca.

After a brief loan spell at Macaé, he returned to Flamengo but did not make any appearance. In early 2009, he was loaned to Social FC so that he could play some matches before his contract expires. As of then he was a free-agent, he signed a contract with Botafogo FC. Together with the other red-blacks, he played and the club won the runners-up trophy in the Second Division Campeonato Candanguense 2009.

In 2010, he signed a contract with Figueirense but the club at the end of the season got relegated to the Campeonato Brasileiro Série B.

In 2011, he played four matches for Democrata SC and the same number of matches for Formosa SC. In the same year, he moved to Duque de Caxias FC and played in a total of three matches in the 2011 Campeonato Carioca.

Oman
In 2012, he made his first move away from Brazil to the Middle East and more accurately to Oman where he signed a six-months contract with Al-Shabab Club. At the end of the season in January 2013, he signed a contract with Al-Musannah SC.

Republic of Macedonia
On 15 August 2014, he made his first move to Europe, more accurately to the Republic of Macedonia, where he signed a one-year contract with FK Teteks.

Honours

Club
With Flamengo
Campeonato Carioca de Juniores (3) : 2005, 2006, 2007
Copa Cultura (1): 2005
Copa Record (1) : 2005
Taça Otávio Pinto Guimarães (1) : 2006
Copa do Brasil (1) : 2006
Taça Guanabara (1) : 2007
Campeonato Carioca (1) : 2007

References

External links
 Player profile @ Flapédia
 Flamengo RJ
 sambafoot
 Guardian Stats Centre
Player Info at Goalzz.com

1987 births
Living people
Brazilian footballers
Brazilian expatriate footballers
Association football midfielders
Expatriate footballers in Oman
Brazilian expatriate sportspeople in Oman
Expatriate footballers in North Macedonia
Brazilian expatriate sportspeople in North Macedonia
CR Flamengo footballers
Macaé Esporte Futebol Clube players
Associação Botafogo Futebol Clube players
Figueirense FC players
Esporte Clube Democrata players
Duque de Caxias Futebol Clube players
Al-Shabab SC (Seeb) players
Al-Musannah SC players
FK Teteks players
Clube Recreativo e Atlético Catalano players
Villa Nova Atlético Clube players
Associação Atlética Portuguesa (RJ) players
Olaria Atlético Clube players
Footballers from Rio de Janeiro (city)